Égriselles-le-Bocage is a commune in the Yonne department in Bourgogne-Franche-Comté in north-central France.

Its inhabitants are called Égrisellois.

Geography
The Lunain river has its source in the commune.

See also
Communes of the Yonne department

References

Communes of Yonne